Antoine Bernier (born 10 September 1997) is a Belgian professional footballer who plays as a winger for Belgian First Division A club RFC Seraing.

Career
Born in Dinant, Bernier started his career at RSC Onhaye in Belgium's fourth tier, making his debut aged 16. He joined RSC Anderlecht's youth set-up in 2014 and signed his first professional contract with the club two years later, in May 2016. He was released by Anderlecht in June 2018 and subsequently joined Royal Antwerp. In January 2019, he joined Lierse SK on loan until the end of the season. In summer 2019, he joined F91 Dudelange on a season-long loan. He joined RFC Seraing on a permanent basis in summer 2020. He achieved promotion to the Belgian First Division A in his debut season at the club. In July 2021, Bernier extended his contract with Seraing by two seasons.

Personal life
Bernier is the younger brother of fellow footballer Florent Bernier.

References

External links

1997 births
Living people
People from Dinant
Footballers from Namur (province)
Belgian footballers
Association football wingers
R.S.C. Anderlecht players
Royal Antwerp F.C. players
Lierse S.K. players
F91 Dudelange players
R.F.C. Seraing (1922) players
Belgian Pro League players
Challenger Pro League players
Belgian Third Division players
Luxembourg National Division players
Belgian expatriate footballers
Expatriate footballers in Luxembourg
Belgian expatriate sportspeople in Luxembourg